Robert Breckenridge Ware "Robin" MacNeil, OC (born January 19, 1931) is a Canadian-American journalist and writer. He is a retired television news anchor who partnered with Jim Lehrer to create The MacNeil/Lehrer Report in 1975.

Early life and education
MacNeil was born in Montreal, the son of Margaret Virginia (née Oxner) and Robert A. S. MacNeil. He grew up in Halifax, Nova Scotia, went to boarding school at Rothesay Collegiate School and Upper Canada College, then attended Dalhousie University and later graduated from Carleton University in Ottawa in 1955.

Career
MacNeil began working in the news field at ITV in London, then for Reuters, and then for NBC News as a correspondent in Washington, D.C. and New York City.

Kennedy assassination
On November 22, 1963, MacNeil was covering President John F. Kennedy's visit to Dallas for NBC News. After shots rang out in Dealey Plaza, MacNeil, who was with the presidential motorcade, followed crowds running onto the Grassy Knoll (he appears in a photo taken just moments after the assassination). He then headed toward the nearest building and encountered a young man leaving the Texas School Book Depository at around 12:33PM CST. He asked the man where the nearest telephone was and the man pointed and went on his way. MacNeil later learned the man he encountered might have been Lee Harvey Oswald. Historian William Manchester reached this conclusion in his book The Death of a President (1967). Recounting the day's events to the Dallas Police, Oswald may have mistaken MacNeil for a Secret Service agent because of his suit, blond crew cut, and press badge. MacNeil has said, "it was possible, but I had no way of confirming that either of the young men I had spoken to was Oswald."

MacNeil sprinted to the phone and dialed the NBC newsroom in New York before telephone lines became overloaded. But to his horror, an NBC employee who answered his call immediately put down the phone and never returned to the call (NBC tracked down the employee the next day and fired him). By a matter of mere seconds, the first news bulletins about the assassination were delivered by Merriman Smith of United Press International, as Smith had been riding in the front row of the White House pool car, which was equipped with an AT&T radiotelephone (Smith won the 1964 Pulitzer Prize for his coverage of the assassination).

MacNeil relayed by phone his report of the shooting to Jim Holton of NBC Radio, who recorded MacNeil's account of what had happened. He then headed to Parkland Hospital, where he arranged a phone connection with Frank McGee, who was anchoring continuous coverage with Bill Ryan and Chet Huntley of NBC-TV in New York. At approximately 1:40 pm CST, MacNeil relayed to McGee that White House acting press secretary Malcolm Kilduff had announced that Kennedy had died at 1:00 CST. That evening, MacNeil went to Dallas police headquarters and saw Oswald twice at close range, including when Oswald said, "[T]hey've taken me in because of the fact that I lived in the Soviet Union. I'm just a patsy", but did not recognize Oswald. (As he was reporting for NBC, MacNeil was at times in relatively close proximity to his future co-anchor and partner Jim Lehrer, also covering the Kennedy visit and assassination for the Dallas Times-Herald, but the two did not meet until several years later, covering the Senate Watergate hearings in Washington for PBS.)

News anchor
In 1967, MacNeil began covering American and European politics for the BBC. From 1971 to 1974, he hosted the news discussion show Washington Week in Review on the Public Broadcasting Service (PBS). MacNeil rose to fame during his coverage of the 1973 Senate Watergate hearings with PBS, for which he later received an Emmy Award. This coverage helped lead to and inspire his most famous role, when he joined Lehrer in 1975 to create the PBS daily evening news program The Robert MacNeil Report, later renamed The MacNeil/Lehrer Report and then The MacNeil/Lehrer NewsHour.

After serving 20 years in the PBS flagship news program, MacNeil retired from his nightly appearances on October 20, 1995; Lehrer anchored the program solo until 2011. The daily news program he co-founded continues today as the PBS NewsHour.

Post-retirement work
In director Michael Almereyda's 2000 modern-day adaptation of Hamlet, MacNeil portrayed the Player King, reimagined as a TV news reporter.

On September 11, 2001, after the terrorist attacks in New York City and Arlington County, Virginia, MacNeil called PBS and offered to help. He joined PBS's coverage of the attacks and their aftermath, interviewing reporters and giving his thoughts on the events.

In 2007, MacNeil hosted the PBS television miniseries America at a Crossroads, which presented independently produced documentaries about the "War on Terrorism". The series initially ran from April 15–20, with further episodes later that year.

In a Sesame Street Special Report, The Muppet Show parody of the Iran-Contra scandal, MacNeil investigated a "Cookiegate" incident involving the Cookie Monster. In 1998, for Season 29's "Slimey to the Moon" story arc, MacNeil took the role of co-anchor with Kermit the Frog, as Slimey, Oscar the Grouch's pet worm, and four other worms made a landing on the moon.

MacNeil chaired the MacDowell Colony's board of directors from 1993 to 2010. He was succeeded by Michael Chabon.

Awards and honors
 1979: LHD honorary degree from Bates College. 
 1997: Officer of the Order of Canada, one of Canada's highest civilian honors, for being "one of the most respected journalists of our time".
 1990: Paul White Award, Radio Television Digital News Association.
 1999: Television Hall of Fame.
 2008: Walter Cronkite Award for Excellence in Journalism

Personal life
MacNeil became a naturalized American citizen in 1997. He is the father of award-winning theatre scenic designer Ian MacNeil.

Bibliography

MacNeil has also written several books, many about his career as a journalist. Since his retirement from NewsHour, MacNeil has also dabbled in writing novels. His books include:

 Breaking News (novel)
 Burden of Desire (novel)
 Eudora Welty: Seeing Black and White
 Looking for My Country: Finding Myself in America
 The People Machine: The Influence of Television on American Politics
 The Right Place at the Right Time
 The Voyage (novel)
 The Way We Were: 1963, The Year Kennedy Was Shot
 The Story of English with Robert McCrum (accompanied by a PBS documentary miniseries in 1986)
 Wordstruck: A Memoir (Published 1989)
 Do You Speak American? (accompanied by a PBS documentary miniseries in 2005)

References

External links

 A Tribute to Robert MacNeil (NewsHour with Jim Lehrer)
 Archive of American Television
 MacNeil/Lehrer Productions

1931 births
20th-century American journalists
American male journalists
Anglophone Quebec people
20th-century Canadian journalists
American people of Canadian descent
American television news anchors
Canadian expatriate journalists in the United States
Canadian expatriate writers in the United States
Canadian television news anchors
Carleton University alumni
Living people
NBC News people
Officers of the Order of Canada
PBS people
Witnesses to the assassination of John F. Kennedy
Writers from Halifax, Nova Scotia
Writers from Montreal